Abu Tesht is a town and Markaz north of Qena governorate (province).

History
It is considered one of the oldest inhabited areas in Egypt as it includes the Naqada area which contain remains of prehistoric civilizations as Naqada culture. It is identified with the Ancient Egyptian city of Per-Djodj, although Daressy identifies the nearby town of Abu Shûsha as the actual Per-Djodj.

Further demographical information
Considered to be amongst the highest populated area in Qena.
Has the highest measured rate of seasonal employment in Qena.
Illiteracy rates are valued as high.

Civil unrest
There are reports of civil disorder within the city that had occurred between Muslim persons estimated at 1000 and Coptic Christians who were attacked on November 17, 2010. Further hostilities contra-religieux are evidenced by the church of St Anthony in the nearby town of Abu Shûsha, having been set alight and the building kept from being rebuilt by Muslim objectors.

See also

 List of cities and towns in Egypt
 2011 Imbaba church attacks
 Nag Hammadi massacre
 Jihad

References 

Populated places in Qena Governorate
Cities in ancient Egypt
Populated places established in the 4th millennium BC